Jackson Island is an irregularly shaped Baffin Island offshore island located in the Arctic Archipelago, in Nunavut's Qikiqtaaluk Region. The uninhabited island lies in the Labrador Sea, at the mouth of Neptune Bay, off the east coast of Hall Peninsula's Finger Land. Christopher Hall Island is to the southeast, while Moodie Island is to the northwest.

See also 
 List of Canadian Arctic islands

References 

Islands of Baffin Island
Uninhabited islands of Qikiqtaaluk Region
Islands of the Labrador Sea